The International Auxiliary Language Association, Inc. (IALA) was an American organisation founded in 1924 to "promote widespread study, discussion and publicity of all questions involved in the establishment of an auxiliary language, together with research and experiment that may hasten such establishment in an intelligent manner and on stable foundations."  Although it was created to determine which auxiliary language of a wide field of contenders was best suited for international communication, it eventually determined that none of them was up to the task and developed its own language, Interlingua.

The IALA continued to publish materials in and about Interlingua until 1953, when its activities were taken up by the new Interlingua Division of Science Service. The IALA was dissolved sometime after 1956.

See also
 History of Interlingua

References

Interlingua organizations
Interlinguistics
Organizations established in 1924